Cricket Australia XI is a domestic cricket team that plays matches against international teams touring Australia. The team formerly played in Australia's JLT Cup limited-overs tournament. Before each tournament, a 14-man squad was selected from young players with state contracts, or Australian National Performance Squad players, who had not been picked in their respective states' 14-man List A squads for that season's tournament. The aim was to develop their skills against top players.

The addition of the Cricket Australia XI to the JLT One-Day Cup expanded the competition to seven teams. The team made their List A debut against New South Wales on 5 October 2015, losing by 279 runs. They scored their first win five days later against Tasmania, winning by 3 runs.

Cricket Australia XI, often with more experienced personnel, also play matches against touring Test teams. Cricket Australia XI made their first-class debut against New Zealand in a tour match on 29 October 2015. The team have since  played first-class matches against Pakistan and South Africa in the 2016–17 season. Cricket Australia XI played two four-day matches against England and one one-day match as part of the 2017–18 tour.

They now play first-class and T20 matches against touring teams, rather than playing in the One Day Cup after what was deemed a success for Cricket Australia. They may return to the one-day competition in future, but were removed for the 2018–19 season because younger players would instead represent state sides, with the national players missing the tournament.

Formation
Announcing the formation of the team in May 2015, Cricket Australia's team performance manager Pat Howard said, "We know we've got the talent and we want to be able to expose these players to more high-pressure game time to help the states and to help the overall national cause."

The team was selected from those young players who were not included in any of the six state squads for the 2015–16 competition. Cricket Australia's national talent manager Greg Chappell said he was confident the side would be competitive against the state teams.

2015–16 Matador Cup season
Cricket Australia XI were overwhelmed in their first two matches of the 2015–16 Matador Cup. In the first, New South Wales scored 3 for 338 then dismissed Cricket Australia XI for 59. Eight of the team were playing their first List A match. In the second match, Victoria dismissed Cricket Australia XI for 79 and made 1 for 81 in 11.1 overs. In their third match, however, Cricket Australia XI scored 7 for 241 and restricted Tasmania to 9 for 238, winning by three runs. Marcus Harris, who scored 84 from 94 balls, won the man of the match award. They again lost heavily in their fourth match, when Western Australia made 5 for 347 and dismissed them for 101. In their fifth match they replied to Queensland's 7 for 282 with 248 all out, Hilton Cartwright scoring 99 off 96 balls and winning the man of the match award. In their sixth and final match South Australia made 5 for 244 and dismissed Cricket Australia XI for 168.

They finished at the bottom of the table. Their leading run-scorer, with 180 runs, was Hilton Cartwright, who also had the highest average, 45.00, and strike-rate, 87.80 runs per 100 balls. Jack Wildermuth took the most wickets, six, and had the best bowling average, 38.00. Matt Dixon had the best figures, 3 for 40.

2015–16 Matador Cup squad

Riley Ayre (ACT/NSW, played in 2 matches)
James Bazley (Qld, 5)
William Bosisto (WA, 6) 
Hilton Cartwright (WA, 5)
Matt Dixon (WA, 5)
Seb Gotch (Vic, 5)
Alex Gregory (SA, 5)
Marcus Harris (WA, 6)
Liam Hatcher (NSW, 2) 
Ryan Lees (Tas, 3)
James Peirson (Qld, 6)
Matthew Short (Vic, 6)
Mitchell Swepson  (Qld, 5) 
Jack Wildermuth  (Qld, 5)

Bosisto captained the side in five matches, Peirson in one.

2016–17 Matador Cup season
Cricket Australia XI were more competitive in the 2016–17 Matador Cup, especially in batting, although they lost all six matches. In the first match they made 5 for 274, Ryan Gibson scoring 106 and winning the man of the match award, before Queensland replied with 7 for 278. In the next match they scored 9 for 236 and Tasmania replied with 2 for 239. In the third match New South Wales made 6 for 328, and Cricket Australia XI fell only four runs short in reply with 6 for 324, Gibson top-scoring with 97. The fourth match was more one-sided: Victoria dismissed Cricket Australia XI for 153 and made 6 for 154 in 21.4 overs. In the fifth match South Australia hit a record score for List A cricket in Australia, 7 for 420, and in reply Cricket Australia XI reached 3 for 226 in the 29th over before being dismissed for 318. In the rain-affected final match Cricket Australia XI scored 8 for 147 off their 15 overs, and Western Australia reached the target of 156 with eight balls to spare.

The leading run-scorers were Gibson with 293 runs at an average of 48.83, and Will Bosisto with 251 at 41.83. Sam Harper had the highest run-rate, scoring his 94 runs at a rate of 136 per 100 balls. The most successful bowler was Arjun Nair with 10 wickets at 24.50; he also had the best figures of 3 for 53.

2016–17 Matador Cup squad

Xavier Bartlett (Qld, played in 3 matches)
James Bazley (Qld, 6)
William Bosisto (WA, 6) 
Jake Carder (WA, 5)
Brendan Doggett (Qld, 4)
Ryan Gibson (NSW, 6)
David Grant (SA, 1)
Sam Grimwade (Vic, 2)
Sam Harper (Vic, 6)
Liam Hatcher (NSW, 3) 
Josh Inglis (WA, 6)
Josh Lalor (NSW, 1)
Ryan Lees (Tas, 2)
Arjun Nair (NSW, 5) 
Tom O'Donnell (Vic, 4)
Jason Sangha (NSW, 1)
Matthew Short (Vic, 5)

Bosisto captained the side in all six matches.

2017–18 JLT One-Day Cup season

Squad
The squad for the 2017–18 JLT Cup, named in September 2017:

2017–18 Ashes Series Tour matches
Cricket Australia XI played two first-class matches, a two-day practice match and one  List A match against England as pre-test warm-up matches for the 2017-18 Ashes series and limited-overs tour.

Squad
The squad for the tour matches, named in November 2017:

Tim Paine captained the team for the first game before being called into Tasmania's Sheffield Shield squad and missing the second. Matthew Short was named captain for the second game, whilst Harry Nielsen replaced Paine in the squad.

First Class Matches

List A Match

Other Cricket Australia XI teams
Teams under similar names often play matches against visiting Test teams. A Cricket Australia Chairman's XI played 11 non-first-class matches between 2003 and 2013. A Cricket Australia Invitation XI played a first-class match in 2013–14. Apart from their List A competition matches, Cricket Australia XI teams have also played three first-class and several other matches since 2014–15.

See also
 National Performance Squad
 Unicorns, a similar team for English players
 West Indies B, a similar team for West Indian players
 Australia A cricket team

References

External links
List A matches played by Cricket Australia XI

Cricket teams in Australia
Cricket clubs established in 2015
2015 establishments in Australia